Michael John Gifford  (born 2 April 1961) is a British diplomat who has been the United Kingdom's Ambassador to Kazakhstan since January 2018.

Career
Gifford joined the Foreign and Commonwealth Office in 1981. From 2004 until 2007 he served as the British Ambassador to Yemen. He was then the Deputy Head of Mission in Cairo. He became the Ambassador to North Korea in October 2012. He left that appointment in December 2015 and was succeeded by Alastair Morgan. After full-time Russian language training he was appointed to be the Ambassador to Kazakhstan from early 2018. He will leave this post in late summer 2021 and retire from the Diplomatic Service.

Gifford was appointed Officer of the Order of the British Empire (OBE) in the 2022 New Year Honours for services to British foreign policy.

Personal life
Gifford is married to his wife, Patricia, and the couple have one son and one daughter.

References

1961 births
Living people
People educated at Hastings Grammar School
Ambassadors of the United Kingdom to North Korea
Ambassadors of the United Kingdom to Yemen
Ambassadors of the United Kingdom to Kazakhstan
Officers of the Order of the British Empire
Members of HM Diplomatic Service
20th-century British diplomats
21st-century British diplomats